Sly Cooper is the title character of the Sly Cooper video game series, developed by Sucker Punch Productions and Sanzaru Games for the PlayStation 2, PlayStation 3, and PlayStation Vita consoles. Sly is voiced by Kevin Miller in all appearances to date. Sly is an anthropomorphic raccoon who is descended from a long line of master thieves and uses his skills, with the help of his long-time friends Bentley and Murray, to pull off heists.

Characteristics
Sly is a 21 year-old gentleman thief raccoon, who is descended from a long line of master thieves who specialize in robbing from legit criminals as opposed to innocent bystanders, thus making them vigilantes. The Cooper clan has ancestry coming from medieval Europe, feudal Japan, and the American frontier, tracing all the way back to Ancient Egypt, making him of multi-racial descent. When Sly was eight years old, his father and mother were murdered by a gang called the Fiendish Five. The gang stole the "Thievius Raccoonus", a book containing the Cooper family's thieving techniques and moves. Sly was sent to an orphanage where he met Bentley, a highly intelligent turtle, and Murray, a comically self-confident and brawny hippopotamus.

Sly is extremely agile and uses his skills, as well as enlisting the help of his two allies Bentley and Murray, in crime or even when infiltrating and intercepting other convicts. Sly carries a hooked cane, a long-standing family heirloom that he inherited from his father, and uses it in many of his maneuvers, including as a blunt weapon. Sly also has the ability to walk on ropes, climb pipes and sneak in order to pickpocket guards for money, keys or loot. Another of his skills is using disguises to get across areas that are otherwise impossible to access. Sly is a competent fighter.

Sly, as a thief, is cunning, devious and secretive. However, he is also loyal, true, brave, friendly and he prefers his relationship with his friends, Bentley and Murray and his, if rather complicated and unrequited, love for Carmelita Fox, a police detective, over loot and riches.

Appearances
Sly made his debut appearance in Sly Cooper and the Thievius Raccoonus. The game starts out by telling his backstory, including history of his family, the death of his father and the theft of his family book, the Thievius Raccoonus. Sly breaks into detective Carmelita Fox's office and takes a case file about the Fiendish Five, the gang responsible for Sly's childhood loss. Sly and his friends, Bentley and Murray, then set out on a journey to collect all of the stolen pages of the book. In the end, Sly defeats Clockwerk, the leader of the gang who killed his father and stole the book.

The second game, Sly 2: Band of Thieves, focuses on a new set of villains: the Klaww Gang. The gang is revealed to have stolen the pieces of Clockwerk. Sly and the gang then seek out the members of the Klaww Gang and steal back the parts. However, the real villain of the game is revealed to be Constable Neyla, who seems to be Sly's ally until she betrays them, and merges with the Clockwerk parts to become Clock-La (a portmanteau of "Clockwerk" and "Neyla"). Sly then fights Clock-La, and as Bentley goes to get the chip which lets Clockwerk live, the mouth closes down and cripples him.

The third game, Sly 3: Honor Among Thieves, takes place roughly a year after Sly 2. Sly's main enemy is now Dr. M, a mysterious mandrill scientist who attempts to claim the Cooper family vault for himself. Sly and Bentley recover Murray, who has been in hiding ever since Bentley's accident (which he blames on himself) and then go to find new members of the gang to help them in the heist of the Cooper Vault.

Sly appeared alongside Bentley in PlayStation Move Heroes, along with Jak and Daxter from the Jak and Daxter franchise and Ratchet and Clank from the Ratchet & Clank franchise. He also appears as a playable character in the crossover fighting game PlayStation All-Stars Battle Royale, where his in-game rival is Nathan Drake, a treasure hunter from the Uncharted series. Sly's storyline begins outside the Cooper Van with Bentley alerting Sly to the fact the Thievius Raccoonus''' last pages were ripped out. Sly sets out to find the culprit, and after arriving in the boss stage by parachuting in, he finds Drake with the pages trying to figure out what they mean. Sly lands and quickly taunts him about carelessly handling the pages, Nathan responds by challenging him to a fight. After defeating the boss of the game, Sly returns to Bentley and Murray with the pages, and Bentley promptly notices that they've been translated into ancient Mesopotamian, and the only translator that Bentley knows of is in Istanbul. After enhancing the Cooper van's performance, they set off for Turkey.

Sly reappeared in the fourth main installment, Sly Cooper: Thieves in Time. The plot centers around not only Sly, but also Bentley, Murray, Carmelita and Sly's ancestors, as they team up together and travel through time to restore the Thievius Raccoonus from being destroyed by their new, time-traveling enemy, Cyrille Le Paradox and his henchmen. Despite some rather close calls (including a twist revealing that Penelope, Bentley's girlfriend, is working for Le Paradox), Sly ultimately manages to defeat all of Le Paradox's cohorts and restore the Thievius Raccoonus; however, in the final battle with Le Paradox aboard his blimp, with his time machine malfunctioning, Sly ends up being transported to Ancient Egypt as the blimp explodes, leaving him stranded in the ancient desert.

In 2009's Infamous, Sly Cooper's calling card can be found on Cole McGrath's backpack. This same easter egg can be seen in Infamouss sequel Infamous 2.

In the 2014 video game Infamous Second Son, Sly Cooper makes an appearance as graffiti painted on a wall. This is very appropriate since this game was created by Sly Cooper's creators Sucker Punch Productions.

In the 2016 Ratchet & Clank film, Sly Cooper appears on Clank's database alongside Daxter from Jak & Daxter as he tries to find out what race Ratchet is.

Sly is referenced in the 2020 PlayStation 4 and PlayStation 5 games, Ghost of Tsushima and Astro's Playroom'', respectively.

Overall, Sly is one of only four characters to appear in every single incarnation of the franchise, the others being Bentley, Murray, and Carmelita Fox.

Reception
GamesRadar listed Sly on their list of "The 25 best new characters of the decade", stating that "'Gentleman thief' is an archetype that’s woefully underrepresented in videogames". They also listed him on their list of "The sexiest new characters of the decade", saying "Sly's the kind of character romance-novelists wish they could write". Sly won an award at the Game Developer's Conference for the best "Original Game Character of the Year" in 2002. In 2012, GamesRadar ranked him as the 74th best hero in video games, calling him "the Danny Ocean of gaming."

References

Anthropomorphic mammals
Anthropomorphic video game characters
Fictional gentleman thieves
Fictional raccoons
Animal characters in video games
Animal superheroes
Fictional American people in video games
Fighting game characters
Male characters in video games
Orphan characters in video games
Sly Cooper characters
Sony Interactive Entertainment protagonists
Video game characters introduced in 2002
Video game mascots
Vigilante characters in video games